Givat Washington (lit. Washington Hill), also known as Beit Raban (lit. House of Raban) is a religious youth village in central Israel. Located near Kvutzat Yavne, it falls under the jurisdiction of Hevel Yavne Regional Council.

History
The village was established in 1946 by the Jewish community of Washington D.C., and initially served as an educational establishment for young Holocaust survivors. It now has a secondary school, a midrasha, an ulpan and an academic college. There is also student housing for the college students, who make up most of the current residents.

Education
The Lycée français Guivat-Washington, a French high school, serves the community.

References

American-Jewish culture in Israel
Jews and Judaism in Washington, D.C.
Youth villages in Israel
Religious Israeli communities
Populated places established in 1946
Populated places in Central District (Israel)
1946 establishments in Mandatory Palestine